Johnson is a city in Washington County, Arkansas, United States. The community is located in the Ozark Mountains and is surrounded by valleys and natural springs. Early settlers took advantage of these natural features and formed an economy based on mining lime, the Johnson Mill and trout. Although a post office was opened in the community in 1887, Johnson did not incorporate until it required the development of a city government to provide utility services in 1961. Located between Fayetteville and Springdale in the heart of the rapidly growing Northwest Arkansas metropolitan statistical area, Johnson has been experiencing a population and building boom in recent years, as indicated by a 46% growth in population between the 2000 and 2010 censuses.

Geography
Johnson is located between Fayetteville and Springdale. The town is located off Exit 69 on I-49 in Northwest Arkansas.

Demographics

2020 census

As of the 2020 United States census, there were 3,609 people, 1,526 households, and 902 families residing in the city.

2000 census
As of the census of 2000, there were 2,319 people, 928 households, and 638 families residing in the city. The racial makeup of the city was 91.55% White, 1.42% Black or African American, 0.69% Native American, 2.11% Asian, 0.09% Pacific Islander, 1.68% from other races, and 2.46% from two or more races.  3.19% of the population were Hispanic or Latino of any race.

There were 928 households, out of which 37.6% had children under the age of 18 living with them, 55.5% were married couples living together, 10.1% had a female householder with no husband present, and 31.3% were non-families. 22.7% of all households were made up of individuals, and 4.1% had someone living alone who was 65 years of age or older.  The average household size was 2.49 and the average family size was 2.98.

In the city, the population was spread out, with 27.8% under the age of 18, 10.3% from 18 to 24, 42.8% from 25 to 44, 13.6% from 45 to 64, and 5.5% who were 65 years of age or older.  The median age was 29 years. For every 100 females, there were 91.3 males.  For every 100 females age 18 and over, there were 87.6 males.

The median income for a household in the city was $44,556, and the median income for a family was $51,618. Males had a median income of $35,189 versus $25,625 for females. The per capita income for the city was $21,502.  About 5.4% of families and 7.6% of the population were below the poverty line, including 10.2% of those under age 18 and 9.6% of those age 65 or over.

Government
The City of Johnson is operated under a mayor/council governmental system. The City Council meets on the second Tuesday of every month.

Governmental officers

Mayor  Chris Keeney
Recorder/treasurer  Jennifer Allen
District Judge Jeff Harper
City Attorney  Harrington Miller
Police Chief  Chris Kelley 
Fire Chief  Chance Wright 
Building Official  Clay Wilson
Councilmember  Bill Burnett
Councilmember  Dan Cross
Councilmember  Bob Fant
Councilmember  Katherine Hudson
Councilmember  Angela Perea
Councilmember  John Wright

Education
Most of Johnson is in the Fayetteville School District while a portion is in the Springdale School District. The former district's comprehensive high school is Fayetteville High School.

In 2022 residents of the Springdale portion are: For elementary school residents are divided between Rollins, Tyson, and Walker elementaries. For middle school most are zoned to Helen Tyson Middle School while some are zoned to Hellstern Middle School. For junior high most are zoned to Southwest Junior High while some are zoned to Central Junior High. All residents of that area are zoned to Har-Ber High School. The Springdale district portion, in 2006, was divided between Tyson Elementary School and Walker Elementary School. All portions of Springdale School District Johnson were zoned to Helen Tyson Middle School, Southwest Junior High School, and Har-Ber.

Infrastructure

Trails
Clear Creek Trail: The nearly three-mile Clear Creek Trail connects Scull Creek Trail to Lake Fayetteville Park and is part of the Northwest Arkansas Razorback Regional Greenway, a 36-mile trail that connects south Fayetteville to north Bentonville, and is funded by a grant from the Walton Family Foundation to the Northwest Arkansas Regional Planning Commission.

Water
Water service in Johnson is provided by Springdale Water Utilities by an inter-municipal agreement. Springdale purchases treated water from Beaver Water District. Wastewater is treated and conveyed into the Springdale system, except the southern reaches which gravity flow into the Fayetteville system.

See also 
 Johnson Switch Building

References

Cities in Washington County, Arkansas
Cities in Arkansas
Northwest Arkansas
1887 establishments in Arkansas